Mauro may refer to:

Bill Mauro (born ), Canadian politician
Carmen Mauro (1926–2003), American baseball player
Eve Mauro (born 1981), American actress
Garry Mauro (born 1948), politician from Texas
Michael Mauro (born 1948), Iowa Secretary of State
Philip Mauro (1859–1952), American lawyer and author
Vic Mauro (born 1987), Australian rugby player

Italian-language surnames